The 1916 Cincinnati Bearcats football team was an American football team that represented the University of Cincinnati as a member of the Ohio Athletic Conference during the 1916 college football season. In their first season under head coach Ion Cortright, the Bearcats compiled a 0–8–1 record (0–6–1 against conference opponents). Harold Altamer was the team captain. The team played its home games at Carson Field in Cincinnati.

Schedule

References

Cincinnati
Cincinnati Bearcats football seasons
College football winless seasons
Cincinnati Bearcats football